Rasbora tubbi is a species of cyprinid fish in the genus Rasbora from northern Borneo.

References

Rasboras
Freshwater fish of East Malaysia
Taxa named by Martin Ralph Brittan
Fish described in 1954